Papua New Guinea send a delegation to compete at the 1976 Summer Olympics in Montreal, Quebec, Canada from 17 July to 1 August 1976. This was the nation's first appearance at a Summer Olympic Games with the nation declaring their independence from Australia a year prior. Papua New Guinea's delegation consisted of six people competing in three sports (Athletics, Boxing and Shooting). The nation's best performance was from Zoffa Yarawi who made it to the second round of the men's light flyweight class in boxing before being eliminated.

Results by event

Athletics at the 1976 Summer Olympics|Athletics
Men's 5,000 metres
 John Kokinai
 Heat — 14:58.33 (→ did not advance)

Men's Marathon
Tau John Tokwepota — 2:38:04 (→ 56th place)
John Kokinai — 2:41:49 (→ 59th place)

Boxing at the 1976 Summer Olympics|Boxing
Men's Light Flyweight (– 48 kg)
 Zoffa Yarawi 
 First Round — Defeated Venostos Ochira (UGA), walk-over
 Second Round — Lost to Jorge Hernández (CUB), knock-out (third round)

References
Official Olympic Reports

Nations at the 1976 Summer Olympics
1976
1976 in Papua New Guinean sport